Daniel Štefulj (born 8 November 1999) is a Croatian footballer who plays as a left-back for Slovenian PrvaLiga club Celje, on loan from Croatian Football League club Dinamo Zagreb.

Club career
Štefulj spent his youth years with Međimurje, Varaždin and NK Zagreb. He started his senior career with NK Zagreb in 2017. In February 2018, he was signed by Rijeka of the Croatian top division. Rijeka loaned Štefulj to Krško in 2018, and then to Varaždin in 2019. In January 2020, he returned to Rijeka.

Personal life
His father Danijel Štefulj was also a footballer.

References

External links
 

1999 births
Living people
People from Hanover Region
Association football fullbacks
Croatian footballers
Croatia under-21 international footballers
NK Zagreb players
HNK Rijeka players
NK Krško players
NK Varaždin (2012) players
GNK Dinamo Zagreb players
NK Celje players
Slovenian PrvaLiga players
Croatian Football League players
Croatian expatriate footballers
Expatriate footballers in Slovenia
Croatian expatriate sportspeople in Slovenia